Guo Yi (born 29 January 1993) is a Chinese footballer who plays for Chinese Super League club Meizhou Hakka.

Club career
Guo joined Boavista youth team system in 2010 and was promoted to the first team in early 2012. He made his senior debut on 1 April 2012, in a 4–2 home victory against Padroense, coming as a substitute for Nuno Tavares in the 79th minute. Guo transferred to Primeira Liga side Marítimo in the summer of 2012. He was sent to the Marítimo B team. On 18 September 2013, he eventually made his debut in the Segunda Liga against Porto B, coming as a substitute for Kukula in the 88th minute. He was loaned to another Segunda Liga club Tondela in January 2014. However, he failed to establish himself within the team and played just one match in the final round of the season which Tondela lost to Moreirense 1–0 on 11 May 2014. Tondela officially announced Guo's departure on 12 May 2014. Guo moved to Portuguese Second Division side Gondomar in August 2014. Guo transferred to LigaPro side Leixões along with Pan Ximing on 6 July 2015.

On 29 January 2016, Guo transferred to Tianjin Teda in the Chinese Super League. He made his debut for Tianjin on 11 May 2016 in a 7–1 away win against Guangdong Haoxin in the 2016 Chinese FA Cup, coming on for Zhou Tong in the half time. On 17 September 2016, he made his Super League debut in a 2–0 away defeat against Jiangsu Suning, coming on as a substitute for Bai Yuefeng in the 73rd minute. 

On 28 February 2018, Guo was loaned to China League One club Meizhou Hakka. He made a permanent transfer to Meizhou Hakka on 2 February 2019. He would go on to be utilized as a vital member of the team that gained promotion to the top tier after coming second within the division at the end of the 2021 China League One campaign.

Career statistics
.

References

External links
 

1993 births
Living people
People from Liuzhou
Chinese footballers
Footballers from Guangxi
Boavista F.C. players
Leixões S.C. players
Tianjin Jinmen Tiger F.C. players
Meizhou Hakka F.C. players
China League One players
Chinese Super League players
Liga Portugal 2 players
Chinese expatriate footballers
Expatriate footballers in Portugal
Chinese expatriate sportspeople in Portugal
Association football midfielders